Moosa Mangera (April 1945 – 15 November 2012) was a South African cricketer. He played 29 first-class matches for Transvaal between 1971 and 1989.

References

External links
 

1945 births
2012 deaths
South African cricketers
Gauteng cricketers
Place of birth missing